Auburn station is an Amtrak station in Auburn, California. Located at the corner of Nevada Street and Fulweiler Street, it serves as the northern terminus of the Capitol Corridor line. The station is not staffed. The platform is next to a short spur track off Track 2 of Union Pacific Railroad's route over Donner Pass. Because of the geography of the city, the Union Pacific's mainline tracks are split, with Track 1 running through the eastern side of the city and Track 2 crossing the western side of the city. The California Zephyr bypasses the city on its route between Roseville and Colfax primarily via Track 1. Auburn became a stop on Amtrak's Capitol Corridor in January 1998.

It is served by one round trip per day from Oakland, and one weekend round trip per day from San Jose. The latter is the only round trip running along the entire  length of the corridor. The latter route stops only to discharge passengers towards Sparks and only to receive passengers towards Sacramento.

Auburn served 13,352 passengers boarding or detraining in fiscal year 2017.

In March 2008, the station (formerly Auburn Multimodal Station) was renamed Robert F. Conheim Auburn Train Station after a long-time Auburn rail rider, who died the previous year.

References

External links 

Auburn Amtrak Station and Nevada Station (USA RailGuide - TrainWeb)

Amtrak stations in Placer County, California
Auburn, California
Railway stations in the United States opened in 1865
1865 establishments in California